{{Infobox person
| name               = Mana Ashida
| image              =
| alt                = 
| caption            = Ashida in 2020
| native_name        = 芦田 愛菜
| native_name_lang   = ja
| birth_name         = 
| birth_date         = 
| birth_place        = Nishinomiya, Hyōgo, Japan
| death_date         = 
| death_place        = 
| nationality        = Japanese
| other_names        = Mana-Chan
| occupation         = Actress, tarento, singer
| years_active       = 2009–present
| employer           = Jobbykids
| known_for          = 
| notable_works      = TV dramasMother (2010)Marumo no Okite (2011)Beautiful Rain (2012)Filmed worksHankyu DenshaUsagi DropJewelpet the Movie: Sweets Dance PrincessPacific Rim
| height             = 
| awards             = Details
| signature          = Signature of Mana Ashida.svg
}}
 is a Japanese actress, talent and singer. Ashida's first appearance was in Asahi Broadcasting Corporation's ABC Short Movie 2, though she rose to prominence after acting in the television drama Mother. She became the youngest lead star in Japanese drama history when she starred in Sayonara Bokutachi no Youchien. She was the youngest lead actress in a television serial drama by appearing in the serial drama Marumo no Okite in the spring of 2011. She also appeared in Japanese films such as Confessions and Bunny Drop.

Ashida and her co-actor Fuku Suzuki sang the 2011 hit song "Maru Maru Mori Mori", the theme song for the television drama Marumo no Okite.

 Career 

 Early career 
Ashida made her debut appearance in Asahi Broadcasting Corporation's ABC Short Movie 2. Bokenmama in 2009. Her first film was the live-action film adaptation of the manga Hanbun no Tsuki ga Noboru Sora in 2010. In the same year, she starred in the film Confessions, as Manami Moriguchi. She also appeared in the film Ghost: In Your Arms Again, a Japanese remake of the 1990 film Ghost. For her role in this film, she became one of the winners of the "Rookie of the Year" Award at the 34th Japan Academy Awards.

In addition to acting, Ashida did voice-over roles for foreign films released in Japan. She voiced Agnes in the Japanese version of the film Despicable Me, and she was the voice of the young Fang Deng in the Japanese release of Aftershock.

 Late 2010 – early 2011: Rise to popularity 

Ashida rose to prominence after appearing in the award-winning television drama Mother, as Reina Michiki, a young child abused by her mother. She won awards such as the Best Supporting Actress at the 14th Nikkan Sports Drama Grand Prix and the Special Award at the 4th Tokyo Drama Awards for her role. At the age of 6, Ashida became the youngest lead actress in a Japanese television drama in the special television drama movie Sayonara Bokutachi no Youchien in 2011. In the spring drama season, she became the youngest actress in a drama series when she starred in the television drama Marumo no Okite. She co-starred in this series with the then-6 years old actor Fuku Suzuki. The series received a viewership rating of 23.9% for its last episode, and an average rating of 15.48% for its entire run.

She made her singing debut with Suzuki. This song, recorded into a single, was released on 25 May 2011 by Universal Music and debuted third on the Oricon charts, which made the duo the youngest group in history to achieve a top-10 position on the Oricon charts. The previous record was set by the group  in 2006. They also participated in the summer edition of the FNS Music Festival, which was broadcast on 6 August 2011 on the Fuji Television network. On 14 August 2011, Ashida appeared in the NHK music television program Music Japan with Suzuki, actress Nozomi Ohashi and actor Seishiro Kato. It was the first time all three appeared in the same show, in its segment entitled "MJ Summer Holidays: Children's Special".

In early 2011, Ashida appeared in several Japanese films, including Inu to Anata no Monogatari, and Hankyū Densha.

 Late 2011: Solo music and variety host debut 
Ashida co-starred with actor Kenichi Matsuyama in the manga adaptation Usagi Drop.  She played the main character Rin, and was widely praised for her performance. The film's director, Sabu, praised her, saying that her laughter "was always echoing throughout the set, creating a peaceful atmosphere inside the set". The Japan Times reviewer Mark Schilling said that she "seamlessly accomplishes her evolution from forlorn waif to perky if unusually perceptive kid, while effortlessly charming everyone.". Mana Ashida won the "Best Newcomer" award at the 54th Blue Ribbon Awards. She was the youngest person to receive this award, beating the 1983 record set by actress Tomoyo Harada.

In October 2011, Ashida began co-hosting the NTV variety and talk show Meringue no Kimochi with the show's long-time hosts, Masami Hisamoto and Asako Ito. This made her the youngest regular host of a talk or variety show.

On 15 September 2011, it was announced that Ashida would make her solo music debut with Universal Music. She released her first single with them in October 2011, and her debut album in late 2011. The album contained songs that "Mama (Mana's mother) wants Mana-chan to sing". Her official profile on Universal Music's website was unveiled during the announcement. The single, a lively dance piece with a cheerful rhythm and similar to Maru–Maru–Mori-Mori!, was entitled .  The single was released in Japan on 26 October 2011, and was used in a commercial for Seven & I Holdings Co. It debuted at the 4th position on the Oricon weekly charts. This made Mana Ashida the youngest solo artist to rank in the Oricon weekly TOP10 charts at 7 years and 4 months old, breaking the previous record of 13 years old set by Kumiko Goto in 1987.

Ashida's debut album, entitled Happy Smile!, was released in Japan on 23 November 2011. It debuted at the 8th position on the Oricon weekly charts, making Mana Ashida the youngest artist, at 7 years 5 months old, to have an album in the top 10 position. She beat the previous record of 13 years and 8 months set in 1974 by Canadian singer Rene Simard.

Ashida and Suzuki became the youngest participants on the annual Kōhaku Uta Gassen singing competition by participating in its 62nd edition.

 2012–present 
Ashida voiced the female lead character of Annie in the Japanese anime film adaptation of the Magic Tree House series in the first role in a 2012 film. She performed the theme song of the anime series Jewelpet Kira☆Deco!. The song, entitled "Zutto Zutto Tomodachi", was also used in the 2012 anime film Jewelpet the Movie: Sweets Dance Princess. Ashida also appeared in the film, as Princess Mana. The song was released as a single on 16 May 2012, and reached number 17 on the Oricon Weekly Singles Charts.

Ashida starred as Miu Kinoshita, the daughter of a single father who suffered from juvenile Alzheimer's disease, in Fuji Television's summer drama series Beautiful Rain. She also sang its theme song, entitled "Ame ni Negai o". Written by singer Yumi Matsutoya, Ame ni Negai o was the first drama theme song Mana performed solo. The single was released in Japan on 1 August 2012.

On 27 December 2012, she held her first solo concert at the Curian Shinagawa General Citizen Hall in Tokyo. 

Ashida made her Hollywood debut playing the role of young Mako Mori in the 2013 film Pacific Rim. She auditioned for the role in October 2011, when she reportedly impressed the judges with her rich expressiveness. She travelled to Toronto to shoot the film, where she also met Guillermo del Toro. Del Toro allegedly allowed Ashida to call him “Totoro-san”, due to her being unable to pronounce his surname.

Ashida also appeared in a Celebrity Kids Edition of the Japanese version of the show Who Wants to Be a Millionaire on January 2, 2013. She won the top prize, ¥1,000,000, and became the youngest top prize winner in the Millionaire franchise.

In 2014, Ashida starred in the television series Ashita, Mama ga Inai as Post, a child abandoned at birth at a baby hatch. Her performance in this television series was highly regarded, with 50.8％ of viewers expressing high satisfaction with her performance in a survey carried out by Oricon. In 2015, she starred in Rugged! as a 10-year-old company president in her first lead role in a NHK television drama.

 Personal life 
Ashida was born on 23 June 2004 in Nishinomiya, Hyogo Prefecture and is an only child. She is commonly nicknamed Mana-chan, which is a combination of her given name and the Japanese honorific used when addressing children (-chan). Ashida revealed that she is a fan of K-pop group Kara. She loves cycling unicycles, and reads over 60 books per month.

In April 2017, Ashida was accepted into Keio Junior High school, one of the most top-notch Junior High schools in the Greater Tokyo Area, after passing the entrance exam.

 Filmography 

 Films 
 Hanbun no Tsuki ga Noboru Sora (2010) as Mirai Natsume
 Confessions (2010) as Manami Moriguchi
 Ghost: In Your Arms Again (2010) as the child ghost
 Inu to Anata no Monogatari (2011) as Mana
 Hankyū Densha (2011) as Ami Hagiwara
 Bunny Drop (2011) as Rin Kaga
 Magic Tree House (2012) as the voice of Annie.
 Liar Game: Saisei (2012) as cool Alice
 Jewelpet the Movie: Sweets Dance Princess (2012) as the voice of Princess Mana
 Nobo no Shiro (2012) as Chidori
 Pacific Rim (2013) as Mako Mori in her childhood
 Kujikenaide (2013) as Toyo Shibata in her childhood
 Entaku (2014) as Kotoko Uzuhara
 Takayuki Yamada 3D The Movie (2017)
 Pokémon the Movie: The Power of Us (2018) as the voice of Margo
 Children of the Sea (2019) as the voice of Ruka Azumi
 Under the Stars (2020) as Chihiro
 Poupelle of Chimney Town (2020) as the voice of Lubicchi
 The House of the Lost on the Cape (2021) as the voice of Yui
 BL Metamorphosis (2022) as Urara Sayama
 Lonely Castle in the Mirror (2022) as the voice of Ōkami-sama

 Television dramas 
 ABC Short Movie 2: Daibokenmama (2009, ABC)
 Ketto! Rojinto (2009, WOWOW)
 Tokujo Kabachi!! (2010, TBS, episode 3)
 Mother (14 April – 23 June 2010, NTV) – Rena Michiki / Tsugumi Suzuhara
 Toilet no Kamisama (5 January 2011, MBS, based on Kana Uemura's song "Toilet no Kamisama") – Kana Uemura (childhood)
 Gō (2011, NHK) – Chacha (Childhood), Sen
 Sayonara Bokutachi no Youchien (30 March 2011, NTV) – Kanna Yamazaki
 Marumo no Okite (24 April – 3 July 2011, CX) – Kaoru Sasakura
 Hanazakari no Kimitachi e (10 July 2011, CX, episode 1) – Kaoru Sasakura (guest)
 Kono Sekai no Katasumi ni (5 August 2011, NTV) – Chizuru Hojo
 Honto ni Atta Kowai Hanashi (2011 Summer Season Special) (3 September 2011, CX)
 Marumo no Okite Special (9 October 2011, CX) – Kaoru Sasakura
 Nankyoku Tairiku (16 October – 18 December 2011, TBS) – Haruka Furudate.
 Alice in Liar Game (5 – 8 March 2012, CX, Spinoff of Liar Game: Saisei film) – Alice.
 Beautiful Rain (1 July 2012, CX) – Miu Kinoshita
 Ashita, Mama ga Inai (15 January 2014 – 12 March 2014, NTV) – Post
 Gin Nikan (10 April 2014 – 5 June 2014, NHK) – Otetsu Maho (childhood)
 Hana-chan no Miso Soup  (30 August 2014, NTV) – Hana Yasutake
 Rugged!  (21 February 2015 – 28 February 2015, NHK) – Noa Fukami
 Our House (17 April 2016 – 12 June 2016, CX) - Sakurako Ban
 Manpuku (2018 – 19, NHK) – narrator
 Kirin ga Kuru (2020 – 21, NHK) - Akechi Tama

 Japanese dub 
 Despicable Me (2010) as Agnes
 Aftershock (2010) as young Fang Deng
 Despicable Me 2 (2013) as Agnes
 The Peanuts Movie (2015) as Little Red-Haired Girl
 Godzilla: King of the Monsters (2019) as Madison Russell
 Godzilla vs. Kong (2021) as Madison Russell

 Variety 
 Meringue (1 October 2011 – 31 March 2012, NTV) – co-host with Hisamoto Masami and Ito Asako
 Music Japan (14 August 2011, NHK)
 62nd Kōhaku Uta Gassen (31 December 2011, NHK)

 Video games 
 Ni no Kuni: Shiroki Seihai no Joō (2011) as voice of the Mysterious Girl (Kokoru).

 Discography 

 Singles 

 Albums 
 Happy Smile! (Universal Music, 23 November 2011)

 Awards 

 2010 
 4th Tokyo Drama Awards: Special Award for Mother 65th The Television Drama Academy Awards: Best Newcomer for Mother 14th Nikkan Sports Drama Grand Prix: Best Supporting Actress for Mother 2011 
 34th Japan Academy Film Prize: Rookie of the Year for Ghost: In Your Arms Again 2011 Tokyo Drama Awards: Best Performance by an Actress for Marumo no Okite and Sayonara Bokutachi no Youchien 53rd Japan Record Award: Special Award for Maru Maru Mori Mori! 54th Blue Ribbon Awards: Best Newcomer for Hankyū Densha and Usagi Drop''

2023 
 47th Elan d'or Awards: Newcomer of the Year

Bibliography 
 ,  (14 December 2010)

References

External links 

  
  on Universal Music 
 

2004 births
Living people
Japanese child actresses
Japanese child singers
People from Nishinomiya
Japanese television actresses
Japanese film actresses
Japanese voice actresses
Universal Music Japan artists
Musicians from Hyōgo Prefecture
21st-century Japanese singers
21st-century Japanese actresses
21st-century Japanese women singers